Greg A. Vaughan is an American writer who creates material for roleplaying games.

Works
Greg A. Vaughan's role-playing credits for the Dungeons & Dragons role-playing game include Drow of the Underdark, Scepter Tower of Spellgard, Anauroch: The Empire of Shade, and The Twilight Tomb.

He was written several adventures for Dungeon magazine and Paizo's Pathfinder and GameMastery lines.  His Pathfinder work includes Pathfinder Adventure Path #6: Spires of Xin-Shalast, and Pathfinder Adventure Path #11: Skeletons of Scarwall.

Wizards of the Coast

Dungeons & Dragons Roleplaying Game

Dungeon Magazine Online (A Dungeons & Dragons Roleplaying Game Supplement)

Paizo Publishing

Dungeon Magazine 

"Tammeraut's Fate" was updated and revised in the 2019 Ghosts of Saltmarsh compilation by Wizards of the Coast.

Dragon Magazine 

 "The Ecology of the Dracolich" was reprinted in 2007 in the Dragon: Monster Ecologies compilation by Paizo Publishing.

Pathfinder Roleplaying Game

Pathfinder Chronicles/Pathfinder Campaign Setting/Pathfinder Modules

Pathfinder Society Scenarios

Pathfinder Adventure Paths 

 The Varnhold Vanishing is one of the original adventures on which the Pathfinder: Kingmaker CRPG is based.

Other Publishers 

 Blood Waters was updated and reprinted in 2012 in Razor Coast by Frog God Games.

Frog God Games 

 Rappan Athuk was updated to 5e D&D, expanded, and reprinted in 2018 in by Frog God Games.

References

External links

 Unofficial indices of Dungeon adventure modules: 

American male writers
Dungeons & Dragons game designers
Living people
Place of birth missing (living people)
Year of birth missing (living people)